The Battle of Vuhledar is an ongoing military engagement, part of the Battle of Donbas during the Russian invasion of Ukraine, around the town of Vuhledar in western Donetsk Oblast, near the de facto border between Ukraine and the self-proclaimed Donetsk People's Republic. Ukrainian commanders have described it as the largest tank battle of the Russo-Ukrainian war to date.

Prelude and prior skirmishes

March–October 2022: Unsuccessful Russian assaults 
In early March following the start of the 2022 Russian invasion of Ukraine, Russian and DPR forces captured the town of Volnovakha and began cementing a siege on Mariupol, connecting with troops in Zaporizhzhia Oblast and effectively seizing much of southern Ukraine. In Vuhledar, just north of Volnovakha, Ukrainian forces prepared defenses, with Russia attacking the town on March 13 and 14. The attack failed however, with the frontline stabilizing just south of Vuhledar through the rest of March and into early April. On April 6, Russian forces shelled a humanitarian warehouse in Vuhledar, killing two people and injuring five. A Russian assault the following day saw fighting break out inside Vuhledar itself, but Ukrainian troops repulsed the attack by the end of the day.

Three civilians were killed by Russian shelling in Vuhledar on May 2. Russian and DPR forces also launched an offensive towards Vuhledar and Kurakhove on May 16, without success. Through June, much of the fighting was contained to drawn-out air and artillery battles near the town. One Ukrainian soldier was killed during these battles.

Throughout much of July, sporadic shelling and the occasional offensive occurred near Vuhledar. Russia and DPR forces launched two assaults on July 12 and July 18, without success. On August 10, Russian forces heavily shelled Vuhledar and the surrounding settlements, and attempted to launch an offensive but failed. Further offensives continued on August 27 and 28, albeit unsuccessfully. Russian assaults towards Vuhledar continued over the following months with little success.

October 2022–January 2023: Capture of Pavlivka and approach towards Vuhledar 

Russian forces launched a massive assault on Pavlivka, directly south of Vuhledar, on the night between October 28 and 29. The assault broke through Ukrainian defenses in the town, with Russian and DPR troops entering the southeastern portion of Pavlivka on October 29. The Ukrainian general staff did not mention shelling of Pavlivka as per usual reports, indicating the town was wholly or partially under Russian control. By November 1, battles raged for the northern half of Pavlivka, with Ukraine drawing troops from nearby villages to support those in Pavlivka. On November 2, Russian forces struck civilian infrastructure in Vuhledar. While Russia captured the town of Pavlivka, dissent grew among Russian soldiers as they suffered severe losses.

On December 20, Russian strikes killed two civilians in Vuhledar and Torske. According to Nazarii Khiszak, a Ukrainian commander on the frontline in Vuhledar, his unit managed to kill 11 Russians on December 27, and 400 within just four days a months before. Other Ukrainian commanders in the area expressed concern about the stability of the town's defense, as local doctors received up to 60 Ukrainian casualties a day. The same source also claimed that the Russians were using a 2S4 Tyulpan self-propelled heavy mortar, which, at 240mm, is the largest currently in use. By early January 2023, Russian forces had made little progress in Bakhmut, although they did break through and capture the town of Soledar albeit with a heavy death toll. Ukrainian and Western analysts believed the assault on Vuhledar was to distract from a lack of progress in the Bakhmut metropolitan area. In December, soldiers of Sergei Shoigu's PMC Patriot were spotted for the first time near Vuhledar.

Battle

January offensive (January 24-February 15) 
The largest assault on Vuhledar throughout the war began on the night of January 24, 2023. On January 25, war correspondent Andriy Rudenko stated that Ukrainian troops had lost the first line of defence near the town, and withdrew to the city. DNR spokesman Daniil Bezsonov claimed that the DPR's Kaskad Battalion had participated in an advance, along with members of the Russian 155th Naval Infantry Brigade. Russian state media claimed this attack led to around 200 Ukrainian casualties.

Localized offensives took place by Russian forces on January 25, although British intelligence assessed it was unlikely that these assaults were able to hold any ground. The spokesman for the Ukrainian Eastern Command, Serhii Cherevatyi, claimed Russian troops fired at Vuhledar 322 times on January 26, with 58 localized battles taking place. Ukrainian troops also repulsed Russian attacks on the western part of the town on January 26, although Russian forces consolidated some positions around the eastern half. Cherevatyi also claimed 109 Russian troops were killed and 188 were wounded. That same day, Belarusian volunteer and activist Eduard Lobau was killed in action fighting near Vuhledar.

On January 27, Russian forces bombarded Vuhledar with a TOS-1 thermobaric bomb. In the following days, Russian forces suffered heavy casualties during the battle, with the 155th Naval Infantry Brigade taking the brunt of the losses. By January 31, British intelligence claimed Russian advances in Vuhledar were unlikely to make any additional progress.

In early February, videos emerged from Vuhledar alleging to show a destroyed Russian column near the town. A Russian assault around February 6 saw 30 tanks and other heavy weapons destroyed by Ukrainian artillery. In an interview by RFE/RL, relatives of killed soldiers stated that many Tatar volunteers from the Alga Battalion were killed in the February 6 attack. These heavy losses saw the main fighting units in Vuhledar become the 72nd Motor Rifle Brigade, comprised predominantly of Tatars. The town's deputy mayor, Maksym Verbovsky, stated that Russian troops were attempting to surround the town from two sides, having advanced to nearby villages although being forced to fall back by Ukrainian defenses.

A Russian offensive was initiated against the Ukrainian defensive line during the second week of February. On 8 February, an offensive of tanks, infantry fighting vehicles (IFVs), and infantry failed with large losses, including the loss of nearly 30 armored vehicles, IFVs and tanks. The Ukrainian military announced almost the entire Russian 155th Naval Infantry Brigade was destroyed and Russia has lost 130 units of equipment, including 36 tanks. In the same announcement, they also claimed that the Russians were losing 150-300 marines per day in the battle. General Rustam Muradov, commander of the Eastern Military District and of the Vuhledar offensive came under fire for the failure to achieve the objective.
On 13 February, a Russian soldier from the 3rd Company of the 155th Brigade said that 500 soldiers had been killed, and that he was one of only eight survivors from his unit.
On 15 February, Ben Wallace, the British Secretary of State for Defence, said that over 1,000 Russian troops had been killed over just two days, and that an entire Russian brigade had effectively been “annihilated”.

Low-intensity clashes and sporadic Russian offensives (February 16-ongoing) 
The American Institute for the Study of War (ISW) assessed that between February 15 and 23rd, Russian forces continued to launch assaults on Vuhledar, although with no significant territorial changes. The ISW also claimed elements of the 155th Naval Infantry Brigade refused to participate in some assaults. By late February, Russian troops had lost so many tanks and vehicles from the first battle that they shifted towards infantry attacks on the town. Speaking to the New York Times, Vladislav Bayak, a commander in the 72nd Mechanized Brigade, claimed many Ukrainian counterattacks are done through ambushing the Russian vehicles using drones or waiting until the tanks are within range of Ukrainian anti-tank missiles.

In March 2023, British intelligence claimed Russian military leadership had not abandoned the prospect of capturing Vuhledar, and that a second large offensive was plausible.

Impact 
In February 2023, Deputy Mayor Verbovsky stated that Vuhledar "was destroyed", with "one hundred percent of the buildings damaged;" fewer than 500 civilians, and only one child, remained in the town once populated with 15,000 residents. The town no longer has running water or electricity because of the damage inflicted on it, with civilians being forced to collect rainwater to drink in February.

Analysis 
Ukrainian officials have called the battle of Vuhledar "the biggest tank battle of the war", with over 130 Russian tanks and APCs being damaged or destroyed in the course of the battle. Analysts believed many of the Russian casualties and loss of equipment stemmed from the makeup of the Russian brigades, being predominantly untrained mobilized recruits.

Military experts speaking to the Wall Street Journal stated that the heavy Russian losses in Vuhledar indicated orders to soldiers were coming from the top down, combined with very little training on mobilized soldiers.

See also 
 List of military engagements during the 2022 Russian invasion of Ukraine
 Timeline of the 2022 Russian invasion of Ukraine: phase 4
 Battle of Pavlivka
 Battle of Marinka (2022–2023)

References

Battles in 2023
Battles of the 2022 Russian invasion of Ukraine
January 2023 events in Ukraine
February 2023 events in Ukraine
March 2023 events in Ukraine
21st century in Donetsk Oblast
Battles involving the Donetsk People's Republic
Eastern Ukraine offensive
Battle